The 2011–12 season are the Esteghlal Football Club's 11th season in the Iran Pro League, and their 18th consecutive season in the top division of Iranian football. They are also competing in the Hazfi Cup and AFC Champions League, and 67th year in existence as a football club. Mojtaba Jabbari and Arash Borhani both with 13 goals are the top scorers of Esteghlal.

Club

Kit 

|
|
|
|}

Coaching staff

Other information

Technical Committee

Player

First team squad
Last updated: 5 January 2012

Iran Pro League squad
As of 1 September 2010. Esteghlal F.C. Iran Pro League Squad 2011-12

AFC Champions League squad
As of 02 February 2012. Esteghlal F.C. Champions League Squad 2011-12

Transfers
Confirmed transfers 2011–12
 Updated on 6 January 2011

Summer 

In:

Out:

Winter 

In:

Out:

Competitions

Overview

Iran Pro League

Standings

Results summary

Results by round

Matches

AFC Champions League

Qualifying play-off

Group stage

Group A

Knockout stage

Hazfi Cup

Matches

Bracket 

Note:     H: Home team,   A: Away team

Friendly Matches

Velayat Cup

Statistics

Appearances 

|}

Top scorers
Includes all competitive matches. The list is sorted by scored goals in Pro League when total goals are equal.

Last updated on 20 May 2012

Friendlies and Pre-season goals are not recognized as competitive match goals.

Top assistors
Includes all competitive matches. The list is sorted by shirt number when total assistors are equal.

Last updated on 22 October 2011

Friendlies and Pre-season goals are not recognized as competitive match assists.

Disciplinary record
Includes all competitive matches. Players with 1 card or more included only.

Last updated on 22 October 2011

{| class="wikitable" style="font-size: 95%; text-align: center;"
|-
!rowspan="2" width="5%"|No.
!rowspan="2" width="5%"|Nat.
!rowspan="2" width="5%"|Position
!rowspan="2" width="20%"|Name
!colspan=3|Iran Pro League
!colspan=3|AFC Champions League
!colspan=3|Hazfi Cup
!colspan=3|Total
|-
!width=60 |
!width=60 |
!width=60 |
!width=60 |
!width=60 |
!width=60 |
!width=60 |
!width=60 |
!width=60 |
!width=60 |
!width=60 |
!width=60 |
|-
| 14
| 
| MF
| Andranik Teymourian
|5
|0
|1
|0
|0
|0
|0
|0
|0
|5
|1
|0
|-
| 37
| 
| MF
| Esmaeil Sharifat
|2
|1
|0
|0
|0
|0
|0
|0
|0
|2
|1
|0
|-
| 6
| 
| MF
| Kianoush Rahmati
|5
|0
|0
|0
|0
|0
|0
|0
|0
|5
|0
|0
|-
| 7
| 
| FW
| Farhad Majidi
|4
|0
|0
|0
|0
|0
|0
|0
|0
|4
|0
|0
|-
| 9
| 
| FW
| Arash Borhani
|2
|0
|0
|0
|0
|0
|0
|0
|0
|2
|0
|0
|-
| 2
| 
| DF
| Khosro Heydari
|3
|0
|0
|0
|0
|0
|0
|0
|0
|3
|0
|0
|-
| 32
| 
| MF
| Fereydoon Zandi
|1
|0
|0
|0
|0
|0
|0
|0
|0
|1
|0
|0
|-
|colspan="4"| TOTALS
|11
|1
|0
|0
|0
|0
|0
|0
|0
|11
|2
|0
|-

Goals conceded 
 Updated on 20 May 2012

Own goals 
 Updated on 20 May 2012

Overall statistics
{|class="wikitable" style="text-align: center;"
|-
!
!Total
! Home
! Away
! Neutral
|-
|align=left| Games played || 48 || 25 || 22 || 1
|-
|align=left| Games won || 29 || 15 || 13 || 1
|-
|align=left| Games drawn || 11 || 5 || 6 || 0
|-
|align=left| Games lost || 8 || 5 || 3 || 0
|-
|align=left| Biggest win || 5-1 || 5-1 || 4-1 || 4-1(Pen)
|-
|align=left| Biggest loss || 2-4 || 2-3 || 2-4 || N/A
|-
|align=left| Biggest win (League) || 4-1 || 3-0 || 4-1 || N/A
|-
|align=left| Biggest win (Cup) || 5-1 || 5-1 || 3-0 || N/A
|-
|align=left| Biggest win (Asia) || N/A || 3-0 || 2-0 || N/A
|-
|align=left| Biggest loss (League) || 2-4 || 2-3 || 2-4 || N/A
|-
|align=left| Biggest loss (Cup) || N/A || N/A || N/A || N/A
|-
|align=left| Biggest loss (Asia) || 0-2 || 1-2 || 0-2 || N/A
|-
|align=left| Clean sheets || 22 || 13 || 8 || 1
|-
|align=left| Goals scored || 81 || 42  || 39  || 0
|-
|align=left| Goals conceded || 41 || 20  || 21  || 0
|-
|align=left| Goal difference || +40 || +22  || +18  || 0
|-
|-
|-
|align=left| Points (League) || 66/102 (%) || 31/51 (%) || 35/51 (%) || N/A
|-
|align=left| Winning rate || % || % || % || %
|-
|align=left| Most appearances || 47 || align=left colspan=3|  Mehdi Rahmati
|-
|align=left| Most minutes played || 4225 || align=left colspan=3|  Mehdi Rahmati
|-
|align=left| Top scorer || 12 || align=left colspan=3|  Mojtaba Jabari
|-
|align=left| Top assister || 13 || align=left colspan=3|  Mojtaba Jabari

See also
2011–12 Persian Gulf Cup
2011–12 Hazfi Cup
2012 AFC Champions League

References

External links
Iran Premier League Statistics
Persian League

2011-12
Iranian football clubs 2011–12 season